Roudnice is a municipality and village in Hradec Králové District in the Hradec Králové Region of the Czech Republic. It has about 700 inhabitants.

Etymology
The name is derived from the red shades of color (in Czech rudá) of the water in the eponymous local brook, caused by the ore subsoil.

Geography
It lies in a flat agricultural landscape of the East Elbe Table. There are several lakes created by flooding sand-gravel quarries. The Roudnický brook flows through the municipality.

History
The first written mention of Roudnice is from 1384. At the end of the 14th century at the latest, a fortress was built north of the village. In 1513, it was acquired by the Pernštejn family and merged with the Pardubice estate. From 1560 until the abolition of serfdom in 1848, it was a property of the royal chamber.

Sights
Roudnice is poor in monuments. The only cultural monuments are two Neoclassical homesteads.

Notable people
Franciszek Ksawery Matejko (1789/1793–1860), musician and teacher

References

External links

Villages in Hradec Králové District